Federle is a surname. Notable people with the surname include:

Egidius Federle (1810–1876), German landscape painter and illustrator
Helmut Federle (born 1944), Swiss painter
Lisa Federle (born 1961), German physician
Michael Federle, American manager and publisher
Tim Federle (born 1980), American writer and screenwriter